The Rabbit Islands (Turkish: Tavşan adaları or Karayer adaları) are a group of small uninhabited Turkish islands in the northern Aegean Sea. To its south are three small rocky islets called Pırasa, Orak and Yılan.

The Rabbit Islands gained some political and strategic significance in the early 20th century, because their territorial waters are important for the control of the entrance to the Dardanelles.

Today the islets are a popular spot for diving enthusiasts.

References

Islands of Çanakkale Province
Uninhabited islands of Turkey
North Aegean islands
Islands of Turkey